Martin Albrecht may refer to:
Martin Albrecht (businessman), Australian businessman
Martin Albrecht (musician), former member of Mystic Prophecy